White Sulphur is an unincorporated community in Delaware County, in the U.S. state of Ohio.

History
A post office called White Sulphur was established in 1858, and remained in operation until 1918. The community was named for a sulphur spring near the original town site. Besides the post office, White Sulphur had a passenger railroad depot.

References

Unincorporated communities in Delaware County, Ohio
Unincorporated communities in Ohio